"When I Get Home" is a song written by John Lennon (credited to Lennon–McCartney), and recorded by the English rock band the Beatles on 2 June 1964, during the last session for their third studio album A Hard Day's Night (1964). Its first US release was on the Something New LP.

Influenced somewhat by the Shirelles, "When I Get Home" is essentially a rock and roll number, but with  unusual chord progressions. Lennon liked this particular ploy, and used it on many of his songs at the time.

Typical also of this period of the Beatles is the vocal leap into falsetto.

Recording
After completing "When I Get Home" in 11 takes, the Beatles finished recording another Lennon song, "Any Time At All", which they had started work on earlier that day. They also recorded Paul McCartney's "Things We Said Today" during the same session.

A mono mix was made on 4 June 1964, although this was replaced when new mono and stereo mixes were made on 22 June.

Cover versions
The band Yellow Matter Custard covered the song for their CD/DVD release One Night In New York City.

There have also been covers by The Rustix, Tony Visconti and Alejandro Escovedo.

Personnel
John Lennon – lead vocal, rhythm guitar
Paul McCartney – harmony vocal, bass, piano
George Harrison – harmony vocal, lead guitar
Ringo Starr – drums
Personnel per Ian MacDonald, except where noted.

Notes

References

External links
 

The Beatles songs
Song recordings produced by George Martin
Songs written by Lennon–McCartney
Songs published by Northern Songs
1964 songs